Vrhovci is a small settlement on the left bank of the Kolpa River in the Municipality of Črnomelj in the White Carniola area of southeastern Slovenia. The area is part of the traditional region of Lower Carniola and is now included in the Southeast Slovenia Statistical Region.

A small roadside chapel in the village is dedicated to Our Lady of Sorrows and dates to 1836.

References

External links

Vrhovci on Geopedia

Populated places in the Municipality of Črnomelj